Simon Edwards may refer to:
 Simon Edwards (musician)
 Simon Edwards (RAF officer)